Rod Appleton (born 15 May 1953) is a former Australian rules footballer, who played for the Fitzroy Football Club in the Victorian Football League (VFL).

References

External links

Australian rules footballers from Melbourne
Fitzroy Football Club players
1953 births
Living people
People from Blackburn, Victoria